Michael J. Saul is an American filmmaker best known for his 2015 dramatic feature film The Surface.

Career
In 2004, Saul wrote and directed his first anthology feature, True Love, followed by Crush in 2009. In 2015 Saul wrote and directed his first single-story feature The Surface starring Harry Hains and Michael Redford Carney. The feature had its world premiere at San Francisco's Frameline Film Festival in 2015 where it was well received by critics. The Surface also screened at the Austin Gay and Lesbian International Film Festival (aGLIFF) in 2015.

Between features and short films, Saul has directed short films, music videos, motion graphics and animation segments, including collaborations with Heath Daniels, Derek Dodge, and Tom Donahue. Since 2014, Saul has collaborated with James FT Hood and Moodswings, directing and animating the 360 immersive dome show Mesmerica, which premiered at the Fleet Science Center in San Diego, California on June 16, 2018.

Saul directed his first short documentary about poet Steven Reigns' art project The Gay Rub in 2018. It's titled The Gay Rub: A Documentary.

Filmography

 Morning Dance (1989) (short) writer, director, editor
 Dominus (1992) (short) writer, director, editor
 Hover (1996) (short) writer, director, editor
 True Love (2004) (feature) writer, director, editor
 Don’t Read Now (2007) (short) writer, director, editor
 Crush (2009) (feature) writer, director, editor
 Go Go Reject (2010) (short) director, editor
 Nightcrawler (2011) (short) writer, director, editor
 My Life is a Diet (2011) (short) director, editor
 Adults Only (2013) (short) director, editor
 Euphoria (2014)(short) writer, director, editor
 The Best Man (2014) (short) director, editor
 The Surface (2015) (feature) writer, director, editor
 The Gay Rub: A Documentary (2018) (short) writer, director, editor

References

External links 
 Official Website

Living people
American male screenwriters
American film directors
Year of birth missing (living people)
American film editors